Solecki, feminine: Solecka, is a Polish-language surname. It is a toponymic surname for someone associated with a place named Solec. The latter place name is derived from the word sól meaning "salt". Notable people with the surname include:

 nee Solecka (born 1947), Polish cultural activist 
Hanna Solecka, Polish female boxer
John Solecki, American United Nations official
Ralph Solecki (1917–2019), American archaeologist
Rose Solecki (born 1925), American archaeologist

See also
Soletsky (disambiguation) 
Soliński, a surname with a similar etymology

References

Polish-language surnames
Polish toponymic surnames